Dieselråttor & sjömansmöss ("Diesel Rats & Sailor Mice") was the Sveriges Television's Christmas calendar in 2002.

Plot
Two children and a group of rats are the main characters. The rats live on board a ship, and have shrunk the children.

Music
Music from the series appeared on the 2004 compilation album Musik från STIM 2004 : ett urval av svenska kompositörer.

Video
The series was released to VHS and DVD in 2003.

References

External links
 

2002 Swedish television series debuts
2002 Swedish television series endings
Sveriges Television's Christmas calendar